A. montanum may refer to:
Aecidium montanum, a rust fungus
Allium montanum, a flowering plant
Altagonum montanum, a ground beetle
Alyssum montanum, a flowering plant
Anadendrum montanum, an epiphytic or epipetric flowering plant of Indonesia
Anthurium montanum, a flowering plant of Central America
Aridarum montanum, an aquatic plant of Borneo
Aspidodiadema montanum, a sea urchin
Asplenium montanum, a fern of the eastern United States